William D. Newland (January 5, 1841–1914) was a United States Navy sailor and a recipient of America's highest military decoration—the Medal of Honor—for his actions in the American Civil War.

Biography
His conduct as loader of Oneidas after 11-inch gun during the August 5, 1864 Battle of Mobile Bay was recognized by the award of the Medal of Honor.

Newland was later promoted to the rank of master's mate and was a member of the Naval Order of the United States.

William D. Newland died at about age 73 and was buried at Prospect Hill Cemetery in Millis, Massachusetts.

Medal of Honor citationRank and Organization:Ordinary Seaman, U.S. Navy. Born: 1841, Medway, Mass. Accredited to: Massachusetts. G.O. No.: 45, 31 December 1864.
 Citation:'
Serving on board the U.S.S. Oneida in the engagement at Mobile Bay, 5 August 1864. Carrying out his duties as loader of the after 11-inch gun, Newland distinguished himself on board for his good conduct and faithful discharge of his station, behaving splendidly under the fire of the enemy and throughout the battle which resulted in the capture of the rebel ram  and the damaging of Fort Morgan.

See also

List of Medal of Honor recipients
List of American Civil War Medal of Honor recipients: M–P

Notes

References

1841 births
1914 deaths
United States Navy Medal of Honor recipients
People from Medway, Massachusetts
Union Navy sailors
American Civil War recipients of the Medal of Honor
Burials at Prospect Hill Cemetery (Millis, Massachusetts)